Pi Beta Phi, often known simply as Pi Phi, is an international women's fraternity founded at Monmouth College, in Monmouth, Illinois on April 28, 1867 as I. C. Sorosis, the first national secret college society of women to be modeled after the men's Greek-letter fraternity.

Pi Phi's headquarters are located in Town and Country, Missouri. Since its founding, the fraternity has installed over 200 chapters and more than 300 alumnae organizations across the United States and Canada. Most of the fraternity's official philanthropies fall under the category of education/literacy programs or the preservation of traditional arts and crafts. Pi Beta Phi is one of 26 international sororities which are members under the umbrella organization of the National Panhellenic Conference.

History

Pi Beta Phi is regarded as the first national women's fraternity. The founders were Clara Brownlee Hutchinson, Libbie Brook Gaddis, Emma Brownlee Kilgore, Margaret Campbell, Rosa Moore, Ada Bruen Grier, Nancy Black Wallace, Jennie Horne Turnbull, Rachel Jane "Jennie" Nicol, Inez Smith Soule, Fannie Thomson, and Fannie Whitenack Libbey, and they created the society to enjoy the benefits of a secret society similar to those formed by collegiate men. They planned their society at a home where two of the women rented a room, choosing I. C. Sorosis as the name and "Pi Beta Phi" as the motto.

Shortly after the founding, the sisters had a jeweler design their official badge: a golden arrow with the letters "I. C." on the wings. When the name was changed to "Pi Beta Phi," the Greek letters replaced "I. C." on the wings. At the Yellowstone Convention of 1934, they voted to limit the links in the badge's chain; there are 12, one for each of the founders.

The first fraternity convention was held in 1868 at the home of Fannie Thomson in Oquawka, Illinois. The fraternity's second chapter was established that same year at Iowa Wesleyan College in Mount Pleasant, Iowa. The expansion made Pi Beta Phi the first national (multi-chapter) women's secret society.

Name change and NPC membership 
At the 1882 convention, the society officially adopted its motto as well as the fraternity colors of wine and silver blue. It began to use Greek letters as its name six years later in 1888, when the name was changed from I. C. Sorosis to Pi Beta Phi. In 1893, with the number of alumnae members growing, the fraternity organized a national alumnae department. Cooperation among women's fraternities and sororities was formalized in 1902 with the founding of the National Panhellenic Conference, of which Pi Beta Phi was a founding member. Meanwhile, chapter expansion continued, and in 1908 the fraternity's first Canadian chapter was established at the University of Toronto.

The fraternity's first philanthropy, Pi Beta Phi Settlement School, was organized in Gatlinburg, Tennessee, in 1912. In 1913, the fraternity created local Alumnae Advisory Committees to support its chapters individually. Central Office, the fraternity headquarters, was established in 1925.

In the 1960s, G. William Domhoff, writing in Who Rules America?, listed Pi Beta Phi as one of "the four or five sororities with nationwide prestige."

Symbols
The official symbol of Pi Beta Phi is the arrow, and the official flower is the wine carnation. The fraternity colors are wine  and silver blue. The unofficial mascot is the angel, nicknamed "Angelica". Pi Beta Phi does not have an official gemstone.

The crest is a lozenge emblazoned with the crest of the Brownlee family, two of whom were founders of the fraternity. The badge (pin) is a golden arrow. The pledge pin is a golden arrowhead with the Greek letter Βeta.

Membership 
The Kansas Alpha chapter began publication of The Arrow in 1885; it would eventually become a quarterly magazine published by the international fraternity for all its members.  Today, dues-paying alumnae receive The Arrow by mail, while others receive it annually and can access it online at the fraternity's web site year round.

Collegiate chapters

Alumnae clubs
Pi Beta Phi alumnae, initiated members in good standing who have graduated or otherwise left their college or university, can organize into local alumnae clubs which are recognized by the fraternity.  Like collegiate chapters, alumnae clubs are grouped geographically into regions, which is led by an Alumnae Regional Director.

International governance
The international fraternity is governed by a Grand Council, elected at each biennial convention and comprising a Grand President and six Grand Vice Presidents (Alumnae, Collegians, Finance/Housing, Community Relations, Fraternity Growth, and Member Experience).  Also elected biennially are seven international Directors (Alumnae, Operations, Finance/Housing, Community Relations, Recruitment, Risk Management and Member Experience) and two Directors for each region (Collegiate Regional Director and Alumnae Regional Director).  The work of Directors is supervised by a member of Grand Council.

In addition to the elected officers, there are several appointed international officers assigned certain functions, such as an archivist and a fraternity historian.

Notable alumnae

Philanthropies
Like many sororities and fraternities, Pi Beta Phi members take part in a number of philanthropy programs.  Over the fraternity's history, philanthropies have included education, literacy, and the preservation of regional arts and crafts.

In 1990, Pi Beta Phi created the Pi Beta Phi Foundation, a 501(c)(3) charitable organization.

Educational and cultural philanthropies
Pi Beta Phi opened the Pi Beta Phi Settlement School in Gatlinburg, Tennessee, in 1912 to provide education, economic opportunity, and health care to the rural area.  Over the years, as the community took over childhood education, Settlement School began to adapt by offering arts and crafts classes in an effort to preserve and promote the region's crafts tradition. An extension of the Pi Beta Phi Settlement School called the Craft Work Shop was begun in 1945 in cooperation with the University of Tennessee.  Now an independent nonprofit organization known as the Arrowmont School of Arts and Crafts, it is one of the oldest arts and crafts centers in the South.

Notable controversies
In 2005, the chapter at the University of California, Los Angeles was penalized for hazing pledges.

In 2010, the chapter at Cornell University received national attention after the release of a seven-page email sent to members of the chapter to address what is acceptable and unacceptable attire for recruitment. The tone of the e-mail—with lines such as "No muffin tops or camel toe" and "I will not tolerate any gross plastic shizz [jewelry]"—drew criticism from the Huffington Post and many online young adult forums.

In 2010, the chapter at the Miami University was suspended for one year after underage drinking, vomiting, littering, and damaging Lake Lyndsay Lodge in Hamilton, Ohio. In August 2017, the organization closed its chapter at Miami, saying that "... the decision was made because the membership experience has routinely fallen below Fraternity expectations, particularly in regards to risk management and the lack of commitment to Pi Beta Phi's core values."

In 2012, the chapter at Bucknell University was suspended for at least three years for violation of the international chapter's policy and position statements regarding event planning-management and alcohol use. The chapter has since closed permanently.

In 2013, the chapter at the University of Nevada at Reno was banned from campus until the last active member graduated due to repeated hazing violations.

In 2013 and 2014, sorority women from multiple chapters at the University of Alabama – including Pi Beta Phi, Kappa Delta, Chi Omega, Delta Delta Delta, Alpha Omicron Pi, and Alpha Gamma Delta – alleged that either active members or some of their alumnae had prevented them from offering membership to black candidates because of their race. An anonymous Pi Beta Phi member told the university newspaper, The Crimson White, that alumnae threatened to cut financial support from the chapter if they offered membership to a black candidate the chapter had wanted to recruit. Students held a campus march to integrate Greek life on campus, and following media and national outcry, the university held a second round of recruitment in hopes of offering membership to more women, including black women.

See also 

 National Panhellenic Conference
 List of social fraternities and sororities
 List of Pi Beta Phi sisters
 List of Pi Beta Phi chapters

References

External links
Pi Beta Phi Fraternity For Women

 
1867 establishments in Illinois
International student societies
National Panhellenic Conference
Student societies in the United States
Student organizations established in 1867
Monmouth College